(commonly known as Tadano) is the main and largest Japan-based manufacturer of cranes and aerial work platforms, considered one of largest crane manufacturers in the world.

History
Masuo Tadano, the founder of the company, started as a steel fabricator in 1919 at Fujitsuka-cho, Takamatsu, Japan. In 1948, he founded TADANO Ltd. and set up the first manufacturing plant of cargo handling equipment, in the following years the company expanded manufacturing to include various industrial equipment. In 1955, TADANO introduced the first hydraulic truck crane with the capacity of 2 tonnage for the Japanese market. In 1960, TADANO successfully manufactured an export model of hydraulic truck crane and exported it to Indonesia.

From then, they have expanded into the worldwide market and established a solid international position in the field of hydraulic mobile cranes. From mid-term plan 2008, they are aiming to become the No.1 manufacturer of LE domain (LE means Lifting Equipment, machinery and equipment reflecting the concept of mobile, gravity-defying equipment for aerial work).
In 1972, TADANO listed company's shares on the first section of the Tokyo Stock Exchange.

They are also known by the project to restore the Ahu Tongariki Moai Statues on Easter island between 1992 and 1994.

TADANO has been accelerating its business worldwide since the early 2000s.
Starting with the establishment of a Middle East office in Dubai (2003), it has acquired US-based crawler crane manufacturer SpanDeck Inc. in 2008 (now TADANO Mantis Corp.), in addition to the launch of production base for truck loader cranes in Thailand (2013).

In May 2013, it has announced the launch of ATF-400G series, the all terrain cranes with 400 metric tons of lifting capacity, which had been developed with its main subsidiary TADANO Faun GmbH.

In August 2013, TADANO announced the new model of rough terrain crane with the largest lifting weight for its kind (145 metric tons), targeting markets in the Americas and the Middle East.

In 2014 the company acquired its UK product distributor. The distributor company, Cranes UK, changed its  name to Tadano UK.
In August 2016 Tadano Ltd. completed its $215 million acquisition of the Demag Mobile Cranes business from Terex. This acquisition expanded the Tadano product line offering for All-Terrain Cranes as well as added a line of Lattice Boom Crawler cranes.

Gallery

References

External links

TADANO Ltd. 
Tadano Group global portal 

Construction equipment manufacturers of Japan
Crane manufacturers
Companies listed on the Tokyo Stock Exchange
Companies based in Kagawa Prefecture
Manufacturing companies established in 1948
Japanese companies established in 1948
Japanese brands